Noriko Ann Kariya (born June 12, 1979) is a Canadian professional female boxer.

Biography
Noriko Kariya grew up interested in becoming a hockey player. Her brothers, Steve Kariya, Martin Kariya, and Paul Kariya, whom she looked up to as a child, were professional hockey players. When Kariya moved to the United States to study at the University of Maine, she became a member of the women's field hockey team, and joined the local boxing gym to keep in shape.

Kariya's presence at the gym was difficult for the gym's other patrons; many felt uncomfortable with having a woman train next to them. Kariya did not feel welcome but came to love the sport of boxing and wanted to pursue it as a career. Kariya moved to Jersey City, New Jersey, where she began training with Mike Skowronski and Teddy Cruz, who have also worked with Arturo Gatti.

In May 2006, a photo of Kariya, with the nickname "Lady Bang", appeared on Ring Magazine. The nickname is a spin-off from her brother, Paul's, winning of the Lady Byng Memorial Trophy in both 1996 and 1997 for the most gentlemanly player of the year.

Amateur career
Noriko Kariya had ten amateur bouts, winning 9 and losing 1.

Professional career
Kariya debuted as a bantamweight fighter on May 29, 2005, beating Cindy Christian by a four-round decision at Hull, Quebec. Her next fight, and her first professional bout outside of Canada, took place on August 19 of the same year. She defeated Camille Casson in Whippany, New Jersey by another four-round decision.

On January 28, 2006, Kariya defeated Maria Contreras on points at Atlantic City, and on May 24, 2006, she fought the undefeated Amanda Knight in New York City. The bout was declared a draw (tie) after four rounds, and both women remained undefeated. On December 13, 2007, Kariya fought Salina Jordan at the Roseland Ballroom with a third round referee decision of Kariya being the outright winner. A punch at the end of the first round by Kariya broke Salina Jordan's cheekbone.

Kariya has 9 wins, 3 losses and 1 draw, with 2 knockout wins.

Professional boxing record

References

External links
 Lady Bang at maxboxing.com
 Noriko Kariya Profile and results from boxrec.com

1979 births
Living people
Canadian female field hockey players
Canadian women boxers
Canadian sportspeople of Japanese descent
Canadian people of Scottish descent
Sportspeople from Vancouver
Bantamweight boxers